Tin(II) sulfate (SnSO4) is a chemical compound. It is a white solid that can absorb enough moisture from the air to become fully dissolved, forming an aqueous solution; this property is known as deliquescence. It can be prepared by a displacement reaction between metallic tin and copper(II) sulfate:
Sn (s) + CuSO4 (aq) → Cu (s) + SnSO4 (aq)

Tin(II) sulfate is a convenient source of tin(II) ions uncontaminated by tin(IV) species.

Structure
In the solid state the sulfate ions are linked together by O-Sn-O bridges. The tin atom has three oxygen atoms arranged pyramidally at 226 pm with the three O-Sn-O bond angles of 79°, 77.1° and 77.1°. Other Sn-O distances are longer ranging from 295 - 334pm.

References

Sulfates
Tin(II) compounds
Deliquescent substances